Kenya is a country in Africa.

Kenya may also refer to:

Places
 Kenya Colony, the former British colony (1920–1963)
 Kenya (1963–1964), a former sovereign state
 Kenya, Lubumbashi, a commune of the city of Lubumbashi in the Democratic Republic of the Congo
 Mount Kenya after which the country is named

Other uses
Kenya (given name), a given name
Ken'ya, a masculine Japanese given name

See also
 Kenia (disambiguation)